Archibald McAllister House, now officially known as Fort Hunter Mansion, is a historic home located on the Susquehanna River approximately 6 miles north of downtown Harrisburg, Dauphin County, Pennsylvania.  It consists of a 2-story, 2-room stone "cabin' built in 1787, to which was added in 1814 a 2 1/2-story, five-bay wide stone dwelling in the Federal style.  The mansion has an overall "T"-floorplan, with the -story 1814 addition in front and the original 1787 cabin and an attached, woodframe summer kitchen built in the mid- to late-19th century to the rear.  The mansion features a front portico with Tuscan order columns above which is a Palladian window on the second floor.  The entry door has a semi-circular fanlight and sidelights with thin wooden ribbing.

The house is open as a 19th-century historic house museum and 40 acre park.

It was added to the National Register of Historic Places in 1976.  It is located in the Fort Hunter Historic District.

References

External links

Historic house museums in Pennsylvania
Buildings and structures in Harrisburg, Pennsylvania
Houses on the National Register of Historic Places in Pennsylvania
Historic American Buildings Survey in Pennsylvania
Federal architecture in Pennsylvania
Houses completed in 1814
Houses in Dauphin County, Pennsylvania
Museums in Harrisburg, Pennsylvania
Parks in Harrisburg, Pennsylvania
National Register of Historic Places in Harrisburg, Pennsylvania